Motley Magazine is an Irish student publication affiliated with University College Cork (UCC). Motley Magazine was originally set up in 2006 by the UCC Journalism and Media Society (now extinct, relaunched in 2018 as the UCC Journalism Society) until it became an official publication of the UCC media executive. Motley Magazine is published monthly during college term since its founding, except for a one year break during the 2009/2010 academic year. It is a free publication, distributed throughout the University College Cork campus.

The magazine won the "best magazine" award at the SMEDIA Awards in 2014, 2015, 2016, and 2017. Since it was created, the magazine has featured major names from the television, music and pop-culture industries, such as Troye Sivan, Amanda Palmer, and the Kaiser Chiefs.

Notable people who have appeared in Motley Magazine

Awards 
 KBC Student Magazine 2014
 KBC Student Magazine 2015
 People's Choice Award 2015 (SMEDIA)
 KBC Student Magazine 2016
 People's Choice Award 2016

References

2006 establishments in Ireland
Magazines established in 2006
Monthly magazines published in Ireland
Student magazines
Student newspapers published in the Republic of Ireland
University College Cork